The Honda Unicorn is a motorcycle developed by Honda Motorcycle & Scooter India (HMSI) and introduced in 2004. It was internally called the CBF150M. The engine was taken from the CRF150F post 2005 engine. The previous version of CRF150F was the old CBZ classic. The design of the bike was done keeping in mind Indian road conditions. Many new features were incorporated, including a two-way air jacket and a diamond frame. The first version of the bike featured spoke wheels and kick start with an optional self-starter.

(Air filled with Nitrogen.)

Honda released this motorcycle to compete with the Bajaj Pulsar and the TVS Apache. Changes included alloy wheels, powder coated engine with a polished head, electric starter, new graphics, clear lens indicator lamps, a trip meter, and a slightly smaller rear grab rail. Few performance changes included minor changes in the cylinder head, overhead valve, ignition remap and a rear sprocket increase of one tooth, which resulted in increased acceleration at the expense of reduced top speed. The air filter was changed from a dry paper to oil-coated to better suit dusty conditions and a new airflow screw in the carburetor.    HMSI sold 720,000 Unicorns in 2007.  The Unicorn overtook the Bajaj Pulsar to rank highest in its category, the premium segment, in the 2005 Motorcycle Total Customer Satisfaction (MTCS) survey of 7,000 customers conducted by the TNS specialist division, TNS Automotive.

Honda began selling the Unicorn Dazzler variation in 2010. It has different bodywork and uses rear disc brake instead of a drum brake.

References

External links

 Honda Unicorn website

Unicorn
Standard motorcycles
Motorcycles introduced in 2004